Anja Breien (born 12 July 1940) is a Norwegian film director and screenwriter. One of the leading figures of the Norwegian film industry, and one of the first women to rise to prominence as a writer-director in Norway, Breien's body of work in fiction and documentary explores social and political issues, notably women's rights within the context of Norwegian society.

Career 
After completing her studies in French at the University of Oslo, Breien went on to graduate from the French film school L'Institut des hautes études cinématographiques (IDHEC) in 1964. She began working in film as a script supervisor on the Nils R. Müller film Det Store Varpet in 1961. She also worked as an assistant director on Hunger (Sult) (1966), directed by Henning Carlsen and based on the novel by Knut Hamsun.

Breien's first film as a director and screenwriter was a short in 1967 titled Growing Up, followed by her short documentary 17. May – A Film about Rituals (17. Mai – En film om ritualer) (1969), a satirical look at the celebration of the Norwegian National Day. Her first feature-length film was Rape (Voldtekt), released in 1971. Rape was praised by critics, but also sparked debate due to its criticism of the Norwegian criminal justice system. 

Breien subsequently wrote and directed Wives (Hustruer) (1975), which became a box-office success and received critical acclaim throughout Scandinavia. Wives was inspired as a feminist response to John Cassavetes' Husbands (1972), and follows three women in their thirties who temporarily abandon their domestic responsibilities for a day of freedom. Breien went on to write and direct two sequels, Wives - Ten Years After (Hustruer 10 År Etter) (1985) and Wives III (Hustruer 20 År Etter) (1996), featuring the same characters ten and twenty years later. 

In 1981's Witch Hunt (Forfølgelsen), Breien again critiqued her home country's patriarchal society through the story of a woman accused of witchcraft in 1630s western Norway. Witch Hunt was entered into the main competition of the 1981 Venice Film Festival.

Breien's 1979 film Next of Kin (Arven), also known as Heritage and The Inheritance, a drama about a Norwegian family in conflict over an inheritance, was nominated for the Palme d'Or at the 1979 Cannes Film Festival; it ended up winning the Prize of the Ecumenical Jury.

Breien has directed most of the films produced from her screenplays, one exception being 1994's Second Sight (Trollsyn), directed by Ola Solum.

In addition to her extensive work in fiction cinema, Breien has continued to make documentaries throughout her career, many of which have been screened internationally. Her short documentary Solvorn (1997), constructed around a series of photographs taken by Breien's grandmother, screened at the Berlin International Film Festival in 1998.

Style 
Breien is noted for her realist approach to storytelling, her use of the long take, and her use of a slow, contemplative pace. Rape (1971) uses a non-chronological storytelling technique and has been compared to Asghar Farhadi’s A Separation (2011).

Selected filmography

Awards and nominations

References

External links

1940 births
Living people
Norwegian film directors
Norwegian screenwriters
Norwegian women film directors
Norwegian women screenwriters
Film people from Oslo
University of Oslo alumni